St Wilfrid's Church is an Anglican church in Halton-on-Lune, a village in the English county of Lancashire. It is an active parish church in the Diocese of Blackburn and the archdeaconry of Lancaster. Halton may have been the site of an ancient Anglo-Saxon minster. Of the current structure, the tower dates from the 16th century and the remainder was built 1876–77 by Paley and Austin. The church is recorded in the National Heritage List for England as a designated Grade II listed building.

History
At the time of the Norman conquest of England in 1066, Halton was the centre of a large manor that belonged to Earl Tostig Godwinson. There is evidence of a Christian site at Halton and there was probably an Anglo-Saxon minster there. There may have been a connection to Bishop Wilfrid ( – c. 709) and certainly by 1252, there was a church dedicated to St Wilfrid. Until the early 18th century, the advowson (the right to appoint a parish priest) belonged to the Lord of the Manor.

A tower was built in the 16th century. The church (excluding the tower) was rebuilt in 1792. The current structure was built 1876–77 by Lancaster-based architecture firm Paley and Austin. The 16th-century tower remains. The churchyard was enlarged in 1872, 1901 and again in 1907.

Architecture

Exterior
St Wilfrid's is constructed of yellow sandstone rubble and has red tile roofs. Its plan consists of a nave, with a tower to the west, north aisle and chancel to the east. There is a two-storey porch on the south side of the nave, with timber framing to the upper storey. The west corners have five-stage diagonal buttresses. It has a crenellated parapet with pinnacles. At the north-east corner there is a vice (spiral stair). There are two-light belfry louvres with hood moulding.

The windows in the south walls are in the Decorated style. There is varying tracery.

Interior and fittings
Internally, the tower measures  square. It has a ring of three bells. Inside the tower there are some remains of Anglo Saxon sculpture. It is accessed from the tower through a segmental arch with a single chamfered order. The nave has four bays. It contains an organ chamber and a vestry.

Stained glass in the church includes images of Joan of Arc and Saint George by Lancaster-based firm Shrigley and Hunt. There is a baptismal font dating from 1848.

Churchyard

The churchyard surrounds the church, particularly to the south and east. There are sandstone gates and gate piers that date from the late 18th century. A lychgate dates from 1907. To the north, there is a two-tiered burial vault built into a hill, with the remains of the Bradshaw family.

South of the church lies an Anglo Saxon high cross.

The base is sandstone and is inscribed with "For Saint Wilfrite Church at Halton 1635. Pereunt et imputantur".

Assessment and administration
St Wilfrid's was designated as a Grade II listed building on 4 October 1967. The Grade II designation is the lowest of the three grades. Architectural historians Pevsner and Hartwell (2009) say that the church is "easily recognizable" as the work of Paley and Austin. The 18th-century gates and piers and the sundial have received separate Grade II designations. The high cross has been designated a scheduled monument as a "good example of 11th century art styles".

St Wilfrid's is an active parish church in the Anglican Diocese of Blackburn, which is part of the Province of York. It is in the archdeaconry of Lancaster and the Deanery of Tunstall. St Wilfrid's shares a benefice with St Saviour's Church in Aughton and St Luke's Church in Slyne-with-Hest.

See also

Listed buildings in Halton-with-Aughton
List of ecclesiastical works by Paley and Austin
Scheduled monuments in Lancashire

References
Footnotes

Bibliography

External links

Churches in the City of Lancaster
Church of England church buildings in Lancashire
Diocese of Blackburn
Grade II listed churches in Lancashire
Paley and Austin buildings
16th-century Church of England church buildings
19th-century Church of England church buildings
Gothic Revival architecture in Lancashire